Sands is an unincorporated community in Marquette County in the U.S. state of Michigan.  The community is located within Sands Township.  As an unincorporated community, Sands has no legally defined boundaries or population statistics of its own.

History
A post office was established at Sands in 1878, and remained in operation until it was discontinued in 1955. The community was named from a sandy plain near the town site.

References

Unincorporated communities in Marquette County, Michigan
Unincorporated communities in Michigan